Optimistic is the adjective form of the word optimism

Optimistic may also refer to:

 Optimistic bias in psychology
 Optimistic Cave, Korolivka, Borshchiv Raion, Ternopil Oblast, Ukraine; a gypsum cave
 "Optimistic" (Skeeter Davis song), 1961
 "Optimistic" (Radiohead song), 2000
 "Optimistic" (Sounds of Blackness song), 1991

See also

 "Be Optimistic", a song performed by Shirley Temple from Little Miss Broadway
 An Optimistic Tragedy (play), a 1933 Soviet stageplay
 An Optimistic Tragedy (film), a 1968 Soviet film
 Optimistic concurrency control in computing
 Optimistic heuristic in computer science
 
 Optimist (disambiguation)
 Optimism (disambiguation)
 Optimization (disambiguation)
 Optimum (disambiguation)